Gulella greenwayi is a species of very small air-breathing land snails, terrestrial pulmonate gastropod mollusks in the family Streptaxidae.

This species is endemic to Tanzania.

References

Fauna of Tanzania
Gulella
Taxonomy articles created by Polbot